Lars Kvant (born 27 March 1955) is a former Swedish professional squash player.

Born in Malmö, Sweden on 27 March 1955. Kvant was a leading European player in the seventies and eighties representing Sweden when they won the 1980 and 1983 European Championships. He was also part of the Swedish team at the 1977, 1979, 1981 & 1983 World Team Squash Championships.

References

External links
 

Swedish male squash players
1955 births
Living people
Sportspeople from Malmö
20th-century Swedish people